Radoslav Apostolov (born 7 June 1997) is a Bulgarian professional footballer who plays as a midfielder for Maritsa.

Career 
Apostolov made his senior debut for the club as a first-half substitute in a 3–1 home win over Cherno More Varna on 13 March 2016. During the second half he was fouled for a penalty kick, which Lachezar Baltanov scored.
Apostolov was loaned to FC Levski Karlovo for the beginning of 2016-17 season. In January 2017 he returned to Botev Plovdiv. On 11 March 2017 Apostolov came on as a substitute during the 1-1 away draw with Cherno More Varna. In July 2020, Apostolov joined Beroe Stara Zagora.

International career

On 25 March 2016 Apostolov was in the starting lineup of Bulgaria U19 for the 0-1 defeat from Belgium U19.

Career statistics

Club

Honours
Botev Plovdiv
Bulgarian Cup: 2016–17
Bulgarian Supercup: 2017

References

External links

Living people
1997 births
Bulgarian footballers
Botev Plovdiv players
FC Levski Karlovo players
PFC Nesebar players
Neftochimic Burgas players
PFC Beroe Stara Zagora players
SFC Etar Veliko Tarnovo players
First Professional Football League (Bulgaria) players
Association football midfielders